Miska Siikonen (born 12 May 1996) is a Finnish professional ice hockey player. He is currently playing with KooKoo in the Finnish Liiga.

Playing career
Siikonen made his Liiga debut playing with the Lahti Pelicans during the 2014–15 season.

After splitting the 2020–21 season between Liiga outfit, JYP Jyväskylä, and HV71 of the Swedish Hockey League (SHL), Siikonen returned to Finland, agreeing to an optional two-year contract with his third Liiga club, KooKoo, on 3 May 2021.

References

External links

1996 births
Living people
Finnish ice hockey forwards
HV71 players
JYP Jyväskylä players
Lahti Pelicans players
Ice hockey people from Tampere